Gonzalo Adrián Casazza (born 23 February 1999) is an Argentine professional footballer who plays as a central midfielder for Atlanta, on loan from Lanús.

Career
Casazza is a product of the Lanús youth system. He was promoted into their first-team squad in mid-2020, notably scoring in friendlies with Defensores de Belgrano and San Lorenzo before appearing on the bench in the succeeding December and January for Copa de la Liga Profesional fixtures away to Aldosivi and Patronato. Casazza's senior debut arrived in that competition on 9 January 2021, with the midfielder coming off the bench to replace Lucas Vera with twelve minutes remaining of a 2–0 home win over Rosario Central. He was loaned to Primera Nacional's Atlanta in February, debuting in a Copa Argentina tie with Villa San Carlos.

Career statistics
.

Notes

References

External links

1999 births
Living people
Place of birth missing (living people)
Argentine footballers
Association football midfielders
Argentine Primera División players
Club Atlético Lanús footballers
Club Atlético Atlanta footballers